Ralf Kleinmann (born March 13, 1971 in Cologne, Germany) is an American football player from Germany who played as a placekicker for NFL Europe team Frankfurt Galaxy from 1995-2000 and 2003-2004.  He also played briefly for the Tampa Bay Buccaneers in the 2003 preseason before being released in late August 2003.

References

1971 births
Living people
Sportspeople from Cologne
German players of American football
Frankfurt Galaxy players